Giorgio Del Vecchio (August 26, 1878 – November 28, 1970) was a prominent Italian legal philosopher of the early 20th century. Among others he influenced the theories of Norberto Bobbio. He is famous for his book Justice.

Biography 

Son of Julius Saviour, Giorgio Del Vecchio was professor of philosophy of law at the University of Ferrara (1904), Sassari (1906), Messina (1909), Bologna (1911) and Rome from 1920 to 1953. He became Rector of the University of Rome from 1925 to 1927. He initially adhered to Fascism like many philosophers of law in Italy (though he removed himself from fascist ideology early on). He lost his professorship twice and for opposite reasons: in 1938 at the hands of fascists because he was a Jew and in 1944 at the hands of anti-fascists because he was accused of sympathizing with fascism early on in his career.

Reinstated in teaching during the Second World War, he worked with the Century of Italy and the magazine Free Pages (publication directed by Vito Panucci). Along with Nino Tripodi, Gioacchino Volpe, Alberto Asquini, Roberto Cantalupo, Ernesto De Marzio and Emilio Betti, he was part of the organizing committee of INSPE, an Institute of research which in the fifties and sixties was opposed to Marxist culture, promoting international conferences and publications. He was founder and director of the International Journal of Philosophy of Law.

He is considered among the major interpreters of Italian Neo-Kantism. Giorgio Del Vecchio, as did his German colleagues, criticized  philosophical positivism, stating that the concept of law can not be derived from the observation of legal phenomena.

In this regard, his beliefs concurred with a dispute that was taking place in Germany between Philosophy, Sociology and Legal General theory which looked to redefine the "philosophy of law" to which Del Vecchio attributed these three tasks:

 logic task: to construct the concept of law;
 phenomenological task: consisting in the study of law as a social phenomenon;
 ontological task: which examines justice's nature or "the essence of law as it should be."

Del Vecchio's  books are used as reference and text books in many colleges and universities.

Works 
The Legal Sense (1902)
The Philosophical Presuppositions of the Concept of Law (1905)
The Concept of Law (1906)
Il concetto della natura e il principio del diritto ("The Concept of Nature and the Principle of Law", 1908)
 
 
On General Principles of Law (1921)
Jurisprudence (1922–23, 4 ed. 1951)
Lessons Philosophy of Law (1930, 13 ed. 1957)
The Crisis of the Science of Law (1934)
History of the Philosophy of Right (1950)
Mutability and Eternity of Law (1954)
Studies on the Right (2 vols., 1958)
Parerga (3 vols., 1961–67)

External links 
 Del Vècchio, Giorgio – treccani.it
 "General Principles of Law"

Philosophers of law
Del Vecchio, Giorgio
Jewish philosophers
1878 births
1970 deaths
20th-century Italian philosophers
Writers from Bologna